Macgregoromyia is a genus of true crane fly in the family Tipulidae.

Distribution
Macgregoromyia species can be found throughout Japan, Philippines, China, and Malaysia.

Species
M. babana Alexander, 1969
M. benguetensis Alexander, 1929
M. brevicula Alexander, 1933
M. brevisector Alexander, 1931
M. celestia Alexander, 1932
M. flatusa Liu & Yang, 2011
M. fohkienensis Alexander, 1949
M. itoi Alexander, 1955
M. perpendicularis Edwards, 1932
M. rectangularis Liu & Yang, 2011
M. shikokuana Alexander, 1954
M. sikkimensis Alexander, 1962
M. syusiro Alexander, 1955
M. szechwanensis Alexander, 1932
M. ternifoliusa Liu & Yang, 2011

References

External links

Tipulidae
Diptera of Asia